The Bluewater Creek Formation is a geologic formation in west-central New Mexico. It preserves fossils dating back to the late Triassic period.

Description
It conformably overlies the Shinarump Conglomerate and conformably underlies the Petrified Forest Formation.

The formation has been correlated with the Salitral Formation of north-central New Mexico on the basis of its lithology, but it is likely somewhat younger, with an age around 219 million years.

Fossils
The formation contains some fossil vertebrates and an extensive fossil flora. Fossil tetrapods from the
Bluewater Creek Formation include the theropod dinosaur Camposaurus, phytosaur Rutiodon, the aetosaurs Desmatosuchus and Stagonolepis, and the metoposaurid Anaschisma. These are characteristic of the late Carnian.

History of investigation
Spencer G. Lucas and S.N. Hayden defined the Bluewater Creek Member of the Chinle Formation in 1989, assigning to it beds formerly assigned either to Division D, lower red member, or Monitor Butte Member of the Chinle Formation. With their subsequent promotion of the Chinle in northwestern New Mexico to group rank, the Bluewater Creek was promoted to the Bluewater Creek Formation.

On the basis of high-precision detrital zircon geochronology, Ramezani, Fastovsky, and Bowring concluded in 2014 that the Bluewater Creek beds are correlative with the uppermost Blue Mesa Member to middle Sonsela Member of the Chinle Formation of the Petrified Forest National Park in Arizona, and recommended that the formation be abandoned.

See also

 List of fossiliferous stratigraphic units in New Mexico
 Paleontology in New Mexico

References

Triassic formations of New Mexico